Daniela Beneck (born 8 July 1946) is a retired Italian freestyle swimmer. She competed at the 1960 and 1964 Olympics in the 100 m, 400 m and 4 × 100 m relay, but was eliminated in the preliminaries.  During her career she set multiple national records in the 100 m, 200 m and 400 m events.

Beneck is married to Roberto Frinolli, who ran 400 m hurdles at the 1964 Olympics. Their son Giorgio Frinolli Puzzilli ran 400 m hurdles at the 2000 Olympics. Daniela's sister Anna also competed in swimming at the 1960 Olympics and married a 400 m Olympic hurdler. Their father Bruno Beneck was a journalist.

References

1946 births
Living people
Italian female freestyle swimmers
Swimmers at the 1960 Summer Olympics
Swimmers at the 1964 Summer Olympics
Olympic swimmers of Italy